Jean Omer Beriziky (born 9 September 1950 in Vohemar) is a Malagasy politician and diplomat who was Prime Minister of Madagascar in the government of consensus of President Andry Rajoelina from 2011 to 2014.

Beriziky, who hails from the northern part of the island, worked as a history professor. He was posted in Brussels as Madagascar's Ambassador to the European Union and Belgium from 1995 to 2006. A member of the LEADER Fanilo political party, Beriziky was  appointed as Prime Minister on 28 October 2011 on the proposal of the party of former President Albert Zafy. He took office on 2 November 2011. He was succeeded by Roger Kolo after newly elected president Hery Rajaonarimampianina appointed Kolo to the post following the 2013 elections.

References 

1950 births
Living people
People from Sava Region
Prime Ministers of Madagascar
Ambassadors of Madagascar to Belgium
Ambassadors of Madagascar to the European Union